Leonardo Longo (born 15 May 1995) is an Italian footballer who plays as a centre back for Forli FC

Club career
He made his professional debut for Prato on 25 April 2012 against Siracusa.

On 13 July 2019, he signed with Casertana. On 24 September 2020, his Casertana contract was terminated by mutual consent.

On 3 October 2020 he joined Cesena.

On 9 February 2022 he join Forli FC, his contract is due to expire 30 June 2022.

External links

References

1995 births
People from Fiesole
Living people
Italian footballers
Italy youth international footballers
Association football defenders
A.C. Prato players
Inter Milan players
Mantova 1911 players
Paganese Calcio 1926 players
S.S. Monopoli 1966 players
A.S. Bisceglie Calcio 1913 players
Casertana F.C. players
Cesena F.C. players
Serie C players
Sportspeople from the Metropolitan City of Florence
Footballers from Tuscany